Panselinos is a Cypriot soap opera that was broadcast from 2009 to 2011 by ANT1 Cyprus.  The show gained notoriety for the unforgettable role of Nixteridas (Greek: Νυχτερίδας), one of the most iconic villains in Cyprus television.

The primary actors included Memos Mpegnis.

External links 
Official website at ant1.com.cy

Cypriot television soap operas